Canz or CANZ may refer to:

People 
 Israel Gottlieb Canz (1690–1753), a German Protestant theologian

Places 
 Native name of Canzo, a town in Italy

Organisations 
 Composers Association of New Zealand
 Corrections Association of New Zealand